Pablo Arturo Garretón (born 26 June 1966 in San Miguel de Tucumán) is a former Argentine rugby union player. He played as a flanker. He is professionally a neurosurgeon.

His father was an avid rugby fan and took him to Tucumán Lawn Tennis when he was only 7 years old, in 1973. A domestic accident made him quit but he would come back to Universitario Rugby Club de Tucumán in 1976, where he would spend most of his career and become one of the most emblematic players. He had his debut for the first team in 1983/84, aged only 17 years old, and he would stay there until 1991/92. He moved to Buenos Aires in 1992 to work in the Italian Hospital. For that reason he moved to Belgrano Athletic and later would play for Hindú Club. He won the URBA tournament in 1997/98.

He had 31 caps for Argentina, from 1987 to 1993, scoring 2 tries, 8 points on aggregate. He was called for the 1991 Rugby World Cup, where he was the captain and played in three games, without scoring. He was the first captain of the "Pumas" from outside Buenos Aires.

He was also President of the Universitario Rugby Club de Tucumán.

References

External links

1966 births
Living people
Argentine rugby union players
Argentina international rugby union players
Rugby union flankers
Universitario Rugby Club de Tucumán players
Hindú Club players
Sportspeople from San Miguel de Tucumán